Adesuwa (A Wasted Lust) is a 2012 Nigerian historical fiction film produced and directed by Lancelot Oduwa Imasuen. It stars Olu Jacobs, Bob-Manuel Udokwu, and Kofi Adjorlolo. The film was scheduled to be released in theatres across Nigeria on 4 May 2012, but due to an ownership rift between the director and executive producer, it was released on DVD. The film was shot in Benin City, Edo State.

It received 10 nominations at the 8th Africa Movie Academy Awards, and won the awards for Achievement in Costume Design, Achievement in Visual effects, and Best Nigerian film.

Cast
Olu Jacobs
Bob-Manuel Udokwu
Kofi Adjorlolo
Ngozi Ezeonu
Cliff Igbinovia
Iyobosa Olaye - Adesuwa

Reception 
Nollywood Reinvented gave Adesuwa a 49% rating; praising its production, directing, and originality. The reviewer found the film interesting but not especially gripping.

See also
 List of Nigerian films of 2012

References

External links
Adesuwa at Nollywood Reinvented

2012 films
Films shot in Benin City
English-language Nigerian films
2010s historical drama films
Drama films based on actual events
Films set in the 1750s
Films set in 1752
Best Visual Effects Africa Movie Academy Award winners
Best Costume Design Africa Movie Academy Award winners
Best Nigerian Film Africa Movie Academy Award winners
Nigerian drama films
2012 drama films
Nigerian films based on actual events
2010s English-language films